Delphaciognathus is an extinct genus of non-mammalian synapsids.

See also 

 List of therapsids

References 

 The main groups of non-mammalian synapsids at Mikko's Phylogeny Archive

Prehistoric synapsid genera
Lopingian synapsids of Africa
Fossil taxa described in 1932
Taxa named by Robert Broom